Arayi is a village in the Aparan Municipality of the Aragatsotn Province of Armenia. It is home to a ruined caravanserai dating back to 1213.

References

Populated places in Aragatsotn Province